David Darg is an American director and cinematographer. In 2011 he co-founded the media company RYOT with Bryn Mooser. He received critical praise for his documentary Body Team 12 which garnered him a nomination for the Academy Award for Best Documentary (Short Subject) at the 88th Academy Awards.

Darg is a pioneer of Virtual Reality film making and directed the first VR film shot in a disaster zone.

In 2015 Darg was commissioned by Apple to create a short documentary using the iPhone 6s ahead of the phone's release.

In addition to his awards for directing, Darg is an Emmy winning editor having won in 2017 with Body Team 12 and nominated in 2018 with Fear Us Women.

Darg spent over a decade as a first responder to natural disasters.  He lived in China for 1 year following the 2008 Sichuan quake and lived in a Haiti for 2.5 years after the 2010 earthquake.

Career
David is the co-founder of RYOT - a US media company acquired by Verizon in 2016. David was named one of Esquire Magazine's "2012 Americans of the Year" for his work in Haiti as well as a "Hollywood Maverick" by Details magazine for his documentary work in crisis and disaster zones.  Darg is a graduate of Oxford University with a degree in Philosophy and has travelled to over 120 countries.

Filmography
 2010: Sun City Picture House
 2012: Baseball in the Time of Cholera 
 2013: The Rider and The Storm 
 2014: Mitimetallica
 2015: Body Team 12
 2015: Nepal Quake Project (Virtual Reality Film)
 2015: The Painter of Jalouzie
 2016: The Rugby Boys of Memphis
 2017: Fear Us Women
 2018: The Robben Island Mandela Experience (Augmented Reality)
 2018: The Young Lions (Virtual Reality Film)
 2019: Lazarus
 2020: You Cannot Kill David Arquette

Humanitarian Work 
Darg spent over a decade as a humanitarian first responder and frontline contributor for Reuters, the BBC and CNN, covering some of the world's largest natural disasters and wars. He has traveled to over 100 countries with experience in cross sector humanitarian development and relief work alongside his position as Vice-president for International Response at Operation Blessing International.

References

External links 
 

Living people
American filmmakers
American humanitarians
Year of birth missing (living people)